Höxter – Gütersloh III – Lippe II is an electoral constituency (German: Wahlkreis) represented in the Bundestag. It elects one member via first-past-the-post voting. Under the current constituency numbering system, it is designated as constituency 136. It is located in eastern North Rhine-Westphalia, comprising the Höxter district, a small part of the Gütersloh district, and the southern part of the Lippe district.

Höxter – Gütersloh III – Lippe II was created for the inaugural 1949 federal election. Since 2013, it has been represented by Christian Haase of the Christian Democratic Union (CDU).

Geography
Höxter – Gütersloh III – Lippe II is located in eastern North Rhine-Westphalia. As of the 2021 federal election, it comprises the entirety of the Höxter district, the municipality of Schloß Holte-Stukenbrock from the Gütersloh district, and the municipalities of Augustdorf, Horn-Bad Meinberg, Lügde, Schieder-Schwalenberg, and Schlangen from the Lippe district.

History
Höxter – Gütersloh III – Lippe II was created in 1949, then known as Warburg–Höxter–Büren. From 1965 through 1976, it was named Höxter. From 1980 through 2017, it was named Höxter – Lippe II. It acquired its current name in the 2021 election. In the 1949 election, it was North Rhine-Westphalia constituency 44 in the numbering system. From 1953 through 1961, it was number 103. From 1965 through 1976, it was number 102. From 1980 through 1998, it was a number 106. From 2002 through 2009, it was number 137. Since 2013, it has been number 136.

Originally, the constituency comprised the districts of Höxter, Warburg, and Büren. From 1980 through 2017, it comprised the district of Höxter and the municipalities of Augustdorf, Detmold, Horn-Bad Meinberg, Lügde, Schieder-Schwalenberg, and Schlangen from the Lippe district. Ahead of the 2021 election, it lost the municipality of Detmold from the Lippe district while acquiring the municipality of Schloß Holte-Stukenbrock from the Gütersloh district.

Members
The constituency has been held continuously by the Christian Democratic Union (CDU) since its creation. It was first represented by Friedrich Holzapfel from 1949 to 1953, followed by Josef Menke until 1965. Heinrich Wilper and Gerd Ritgen then each served a single term. Leo Ernesti was representative from 1972 to 1980, when he was succeeded by Meinolf Michels, who served until 2002. Jürgen Herrmann was representative from 2002 to 2013. Christian Haase was elected in 2013, and re-elected in 2017 and 2021.

Election results

2021 election

2017 election

2013 election

2009 election

Notes

References

Federal electoral districts in North Rhine-Westphalia
1949 establishments in West Germany
Constituencies established in 1949
Höxter (district)
Gütersloh (district)
Lippe